Schmetterlinge ("Butterflies") is a West German film directed by Wolfgang Becker. It won the Golden Leopard at the 1988 Locarno International Film Festival.

Reception
It won the Golden Leopard at the 1988 Locarno International Film Festival.

References

External links

1988 films
1988 directorial debut films
West German films
German drama short films
Films directed by Wolfgang Becker (director, born 1954)
Golden Leopard winners
1980s German films